Tomasz Szymkowiak (born 5 July 1983 in Września) is a Polish track and field athlete who mainly competes in the 3000 metres steeplechase.

Achievements

References
 

1983 births
Living people
Polish male steeplechase runners
Athletes (track and field) at the 2008 Summer Olympics
Olympic athletes of Poland
People from Września
Sportspeople from Greater Poland Voivodeship